The PT-37 was an American PT-20 class motor torpedo boat deployed in World War II. It was laid down 12 April 1941 by the Electric Boat Co., Elco Works, Bayonne, NJ, and entered service on 18 July 1941.

On 11–12 December 1942, while patrolling off Guadalcanal, PT-37 and PT-40 attacked the Japanese destroyer Teruzuki (then the flagship of Rear Admiral Raizō Tanaka), successfully hitting her with torpedoes. Depth charges on the ship eventually exploded causing her to sink three hours later.

PT-37 was sunk by gunfire from the Japanese destroyer Kawakaze off Guadalcanal on 1 February 1943.

Further reading
 Dictionary of American Naval Fighting Ships - USS PT 
 At Close Quarters: PT Boats in the United States Navy
 Motor Torpedo Boat Manual, February 1943

References

37
1941 ships
World War II ships of the United States
World War II patrol vessels of the United States